Pietra Brettkelly (born 1965) is a New Zealand filmmaker, known for her documentaries. She is a documentary filmmaker submitted three times for Oscar consideration, a member of The Academy of Motion Pictures Arts and Sciences, and was recently named an Arts Laureate of New Zealand. Her films have premiered in five of the world's top six film festivals – Sundance, Toronto, Venice, Berlin and Tribeca Film Festivals – and have garnered many awards. She is known for her independent, risk-taking style, which has taken her to many different countries. She approaches her subjects' lives with a "quiet" demeanor and "non-judgmental" attitude, allowing her to capture and document real stories.

Early life and education 

Brettkelly was born in Whakatane, New Zealand in 1965. She has mentioned that there was not a film school in New Zealand. She did not receive a film education and said that, "I couldn’t say that theoretically or academically I’ve studied filmmakers to know what they would do or how they would approach something."

Brettkelly wrote about herself, "My parents took me from Papua New Guinea to Portugal, encouraging a wonder and appreciation for the diversity of peoples and their stories". Additionally, she travelled the world as a journalist before directing her first documentary "Beauty Will Save the World" (2003) about the first ever beauty pageant in Libya. VIVA Magazine wrote of Brettkelly: "An extraordinary person who has led an extraordinary life… from Libya to Sudan, Afghanistan and China".  When she was first starting out, traveling and experiencing new cultures seemed to be her greatest teacher when it came to making a documentary.

Documentary career

Brettkelly's 2018 film, Yellow Is Forbidden, premiered In Competition and Opening Weekend at Tribeca Film Festival. The film was selected for both the Best Foreign Language and Best Documentary sections of the Oscars. Vogue Magazine noted it as a, "film that is … a celebration of how extraordinary women are", while the Sydney Morning Herald called it, "[a] deliciously intimate film ... a near visceral experience". The film follows the rise of talented Chinese haute couturier Guo Pei. In an article, Rebekah Brammer describes the documentary as depicting the meticulous images of magnificent gowns, intimate footage, insightful interviews, culture clash, craft and aspiration, and the grueling labor behind high fashion. Brammer says, "Brettkelly’s portrayal of Guo, with all her contradictions, leaves the audience, whether interested in fashion or not, wanting to know more about her".

Brettkelly's film, A Flickering Truth, which documents the unearthing of the Afghan Film Archive in Kabul, Afghanistan, premiered at the 2015 Venice Film Festival and Toronto Film Festival to critical acclaim. It received a four star review in The Guardian, which described it as "an astounding film". Deborah Young of The Hollywood Reporter praised the film, describing it as, "a documentary not just for archivists but for those who see film as a vital part of local culture", while Indiewire writer Eric Kohn called the movie an "eye-opening documentary ... a moving navigation of Afghanistan’s past and present". A Flickering Truth was selected as the New Zealand entrant for the 2016 Best Foreign Language at the Oscars. Brettkelly said about the film, "When I first went to Afghanistan, I found the people so different from what I have been fed through media and reportage," and thus, her mission became to tell a story that completely altered awareness of Afghans.

In 2012, Brettkelly's Māori Boy Genius premiered In Competition at Berlin Film Festival. It follows a boy named Ngaa Rauuira Pumanawawhit, after he's accepted into Yale summer school.

Brettkelly met Italian artist Vanessa Beecroft when filming in Sudan after the end of one of the longest running civil war in African history. Beecroft is famous for her provocative performance art, and while in Sudan for a project had decided to try and adopt motherless twins. Brettkelly eventually followed Beecroft's adoption efforts over 16 months, which formed the basis for The Art Star and the Sudanese Twins. Still in Motion (magazine)'s editor posited, "I felt I was in the hands of a master storyteller." The film won Best Editing in the World Documentary section of the Sundance Film Festival.

Her Beauty Will Save The World (2003)'s World Premier American Film Institute Film Festival in Los Angeles. Brettkelly's website describes the film, "Beauty Will Save The World follows the exploits of 19 year-old Teca Zendik, the American contender for the crown. She sets out with her political loyalties in check, even refusing to wear the competition uniform – a teeshirt emblazoned with Gadaffi’s likeness. How then does she assume the position of honorary consul to the US for Libya in a mere matter of months? Marvel at how diplomatic ties are re-established between two nations, enjoy the behind-the-scenes antics of a beauty pageant, and seize the chance to see rare footage of Gadaffi himself in this accidental political documentary."

Style and themes 

Brettkelly said in an interview, "There are two common themes in all my films. One is identity and the other is isolation. Isolation, because I live in New Zealand. Identity, because I’m a first-generation New Zealander… [My parents] brought me up to be curious and to think about what I could bring to this new place." Brettkelly says, "A Flickering Truth explores identity and isolation."

In the film, Yellow is Forbidden, themes of isolation, the complexity of life, and celebrating the extreme appear also. There are many close-up shots in the film. Some are of hands, like of Guo Pei designing a garment or her sewers creating the dress, while others are of the garments themselves, with their threads, beads, and jewels sparkling in the shot. Brettkelly isolates a single item or image in these shots, often blurring the background, which visually depicts her theme of isolation.

When it comes to the documentary process, Brettkelly likes to write her films, though she doesn't follow a script when filming her documentaries. She says, "Another part of my process is I write my films, like a drama film. It’s not something that I share with anybody. Sometimes I’m writing some quite horrific moments, things that, as a human being, I don’t want to happen but, as a storyteller, I imagine are going to happen. If I write that someone dies from a bomb blast, well, over time in Afghanistan, sadly, that’s likely to happen." In the same interview, she talks about one specific scene where this writing process stuck out in her mind, "That scene of the young woman at a screening who looks at the camera, I wrote that. It was two years before we filmed it. Of course, I tell Jake [cinematographer Jacob Bryant] everything so he can be on the lookout for these situations when they arise. When it was happening, he just sort of looked at me, 'can you believe this,' and the girl just stared down the camera. Her face said, I’m looking at you looking at me, and it’s OK."

Further reflecting on Brettkelly's style, Variety magazine says, "Pietra Brettkelly’s engimatic rendering … is not a straightforward artist’s profile, political commentary or domestic drama, but a poetic fusion of the three." This relates to how Brettkelly views her work, saying, "I believe my films have a considered quietness, a non-judgmental approach that allows subjects to tell their stories. I treasure the honesty and the privilege people grant me in capturing and documenting an often pivotal time in their lives." So, obviously Brettkelly's work is not straightforward. It is purposely ambiguous to highlight the genuine ambiguity present in her subjects' real lives.

Brettkelly writes, "The risks I’ve taken in making some of my documentaries exhibit either passion or craziness. I am motivated by stories that matter, the personal journeys that reflect a bigger issue."

Filmography

Awards and honors

Further reading 
 Pietra Brettkelly, 2019 Arts Foundation Laureate receiving the Dame Gaylene Preston Award for Documentary Filmmakers
 List of female film and television directors

References

External links 
Filmography
 
 
 

Media and reviews

 Article Meet the Designer Behind Rihanna’s Meme-Generating Met Gala Cape Fashion Magazine, 1 May 2018
 Article Fashion Documentaries Make a Splash at Tribeca The Business of Fashion, 27 April 2018
 Article Fashion Documentaries Go Behind The Scenes on McQueen and Guo Pei Style Celebrity, 20 April 2018
 Article Making Movies with Filmmaker Pietra Brettkelly WIFT Autumn 2008
 Article Q&A: Pietra Brettkelly The Big Idea, 18 July 2008 
 Review Eye-opening documentary about Chinese fashion designer Guo Pei Screen Daily, 22 April 2018
 Review A Flickering Truth: Venice Review The Hollywood Reporter, 20 September 2015
 Profile Pietra Brettkelly Now Toronto, 24 April 2008

Official Websites
Yellow is Forbidden
A Flickering Truth
The Art Star and the Sudanese Twins
Māori Boy Genius
Pietra Brettkelly

New Zealand documentary filmmakers
Living people
New Zealand film directors
New Zealand women film directors
People from Auckland
Women documentary filmmakers
Documentary film directors
1965 births